Ravi Kumar Narra is an Indian businessman and social worker from Secunderabad, known for his efforts for the upliftment of the dalit community. He was honoured by the Government of India, in 2014, by bestowing on him the Padma Shri, the fourth highest civilian award, for his services to society.

Biography

Ravi Kumar Narra was born on 1 September 1963, to Shankaraiah Narra, who was a daily wage mason, in a family with meagre financial resources, in a slum in Secunderabad, commonly known as the twin city of Hyderabad, in the south Indian State of Telangana. He graduated in science, (BSc), and continued his education in law and secured a graduate degree, LLB and, later, the master's degree of LLM. He also secured a diploma in journalism (DJ) and a diploma in Public Relations.

Dalit enterprise

Narra is the coordinator for the Dalit Indian Chamber of Commerce and Industry (DICCI) in South India, covering five states. He has also been President of DICCI, Andhra Pradesh Chapter since 2011. As a member of the National Governing Board of DICCI, he helped to modify the Government Industrial Policy 2010-2015 such that it aided Dalits.

He has been a member of the National Task Force (NTF) of the Government of India, for Affirmative Action and Supplier Diversity.

Narra organise IGNITE, a 21 days residential programme for 220 Dalit entrepreneurs including 40 women from all over Andhra Pradesh at the NIMSME, Hyderabad. It is an entrepreneurship development programme involving the Government, CII, banks, training institutions and similar.

Shanti Chakra Foundation

Narra founded Shanti Chakra Foundation, a service organisation to develop networking amongst Dalits. It promotes the philosophy of B. R. Ambedkar and educates against superstitions. The Foundation undertakes weekly classes for Dalits - particularly youths - on a range of subjects.

Awards and recognitions
Ravi Kumar Narra was honoured by the Government of India with the Padma Shri in 2014, in recognition of his services to society.

References

External links
 
 

1963 births
Living people
Recipients of the Padma Shri in trade and industry
Social workers
Dalit leaders
People from Secunderabad
Social workers from Andhra Pradesh